Streamline Studios, founded in 2001, is a global creative and technology company for video games and beyond. Their partners include Capcom, Microsoft, Coca-Cola, Square Enix, BBC Sport, and Balenciaga. GenVid Technologies, Epic Games, Unity3D, and 2K Games.

History 
Streamline was founded in 2001 in Hilversum, The Netherlands, by four young, passionate gamers with a gift for modding and developing original games; Alexander Fernandez, Stefan Baier, Adrian Banninga and Renier Banninga. They sold their art and game development skills as a creative and technical outsourcing vendor to fund that passion. From there, they developed relationships with AAA developers and publishers and sought out like-minded people to partner with.

Stefan Baier, Adrian Banninga and Renier Banninga met during their stint at Rewolf Software, working on the Half-Life mod, Gunman Chronicles. When Rewolf Software dissolved, Baier and the Banninga brothers moved to The Netherlands, where they formed the company with Alexander Fernandez. In 2005 the company moved to Amsterdam where they operated for a few years, before moving to New York, USA. In 2010, Streamline made the move to open in Southeast Asia, an emerging market for video game development and gamers.

In 2021, Streamline announced its expansion of game development and services to its US-based headquarters in Las Vegas, NV.

This expansion plan supports the growth of multiple lines of business including Streamframe, its proprietary game development platform and diverse digital offerings centered around the metaverse and enterprise gaming in the Americas.

Games 
Streamline Studios has an extensive portfolio and development relationships with some of the world's most renowned franchises, games, and brands including:

 Street Fighter V 
 Final Fantasy XV
 Monster of the Deep: Final Fantasy XV
 Oddworld: Soulstorm
 Outriders 
 Afterworld: The Age of Tomorrow 
 SpongeBob SquarePants: Battle for Bikini Bottom - Rehydrated
 Altspace VR
 BioShock Infinite
 Pillars of Eternity 
 Unreal Tournament 
 Marvel vs. Capcom Infinite 
 Death Stranding 
 Killer Instinct 
 Gears of War

Intellectual Properties

HoopWorld 
HoopWorld is Streamline Studios first original IP and was released in July 2010 on WiiWare in North and South America. In August that year the game was also released in Europe, Australia and New Zealand under the title, HoopWorld BasketBrawl.

Axon Runners 
In 2012, Axon Runners was developed in partnership with Streamline Studios and the Coca-Cola Content Factory for the iOS.

NightStream 
Released in September 2018 to iOS devices, NightStream is a next generation runner game set in the futuristic city of Persepolis. Surf on surfaces like walls, pipes, and even ceilings to avoid obstacles.

Bake 'N Switch 
Released in August 2020, Bake ‘n Switch is a cute, yet tough couch co-op and PvP party game for 1-4 players. Embark on a 'Bun Solo' single-player adventure or team up with other Bakers to catch, throw, and bake a'dough'rable living bread creatures! The game is available digitally on Nintendo and Steam platforms.

References

External links 

Video game development companies
Video game companies of the Netherlands
Video game companies of Malaysia